Asurgylla is a monotypic moth genus in the subfamily Arctiinae erected by Sergius G. Kiriakoff in 1958. Its single species, Asurgylla collenettei, described in the same publication, is found in Kenya and Uganda.

References

Lithosiini
Moths of Africa
Monotypic moth genera